New, Improved Recording is a recording studio in Oakland, California, near the borders of Emeryville and Berkeley in the San Francisco Bay Area of Northern California.

History
First established in 2003 by Bay Area musicians/engineers Eli Crews and John Finkbeiner, New, Improved Recording became home to many well-known independent productions. The studio was once home to En Vogue but found a radical change in sound and clientele once turned over. The studio employs both analog and digital recording, allowing a wide range of engineers, musicians and projects to work there.

Some of the more notable acts to have used the studio include: Deerhoof, Beulah, Thee More Shallows, Why?, Erase Errata, Mike Watt, Rogue Wave, Subtle, Anathallo, The Ebb and Flow, Scrabbel, Society of Rockets, Crime, XBXRX, and Love Is Chemicals.

Engineers
Eli Crews
John Finkbeiner
Jay Pellicci
Christopher Cline
Aaron Prellwitz

Discography
AIDS Wolf
Anathallo
Apache
Beulah
Carta
Citay
Crime
Cryptacize
The Curtains
Deerhoof
Dreamdate
Erase Errata
The Invisible Cities
Miles Kurosky
Love Is Chemicals
Scrabbel
Sholi
The Society of Rockets
Thee More Shallows
Tune-Yards
Why?

External links
 Official site

Audio engineering
Recording studios in California
Companies based in Oakland, California
Music of the San Francisco Bay Area